Ernesto Alfaro (born 10 March 1946) is a Colombian racewalker. He competed in the men's 20 kilometres walk at the 1976 Summer Olympics and the 1980 Summer Olympics.

References

External links

1946 births
Living people
Athletes (track and field) at the 1975 Pan American Games
Athletes (track and field) at the 1979 Pan American Games
Athletes (track and field) at the 1976 Summer Olympics
Athletes (track and field) at the 1980 Summer Olympics
Colombian male racewalkers
Olympic athletes of Colombia
Place of birth missing (living people)
Central American and Caribbean Games medalists in athletics
Central American and Caribbean Games bronze medalists for Colombia
Competitors at the 1974 Central American and Caribbean Games
Pan American Games competitors for Colombia
20th-century Colombian people
21st-century Colombian people